Frasier is an upcoming American television sitcom. A revival and spin-off of the original series Frasier, featuring the character of Frasier Crane, who originated on Cheers in the 1980s before being spun off into his own show in the '90s. It is due to air on Paramount+ in mid-2023.

Cast 
 Kelsey Grammer as Frasier Crane
 Nicholas Lyndhurst as Alan Cornwall, Frasier's old college buddy-turned-professor
 Jack Cutmore-Scott as Frederick "Freddy" Crane, Frasier's son
 Anders Keith as David, Frasier’s nephew – the son of Niles and Daphne, who was born in the original series finale
 Jess Salgueiro as Eve, Freddy's roommate
 Toks Olagundoye as Olivia, the head of  an Ivy League university psych department
 Bebe Neuwirth as Lilith Sternin (guest star)

Plot 
Much of the plot is still under wraps. Star Kelsey Grammer has described it as a "third act" for the character. The series will take place in Boston, the same city where Cheers - on which the character of Frasier was introduced - was set. The setting will also involve a university campus. Variety states that the series follows Frasier "in the next chapter of his life as he returns to Boston, Massachusetts, with new challenges to face, new relationships to forge and an old dream or two to finally fulfill.”

Production

Background 
Talks of a revival began in 2016, but were initially denied by Grammer, though they resurfaced in mid- to late 2018, with Grammer confirming they were looking into it. In February and March 2019, he said in several interviews that a reboot was likely. Grammer has said the revival will be a "third act" for the Frasier Crane character and is likely to be in a new setting other than Seattle. He has also indicated a new series will pay tribute to John Mahoney, who died in 2018.

In late 2019, Grammer said "we've hatched a plan for Frasier reboot," and it was originally reported that it would air in 2020. In February 2021, it was reported that the revival was being discussed at Paramount+, formerly CBS All Access, possibly for a ten-episode season order for 2022.

Announcement 
On February 24, 2021, the sequel series was greenlit for exclusive debut on Paramount+. Grammer said he "gleefully" anticipated "sharing the next chapter in the continuing journey of Dr. Frasier Crane" as he had "spent over 20 years" of his "creative life on the Paramount lot".

In October 2022, Paramount+ officially gave the series a 10 episode order.

Casting 
Casting director Jeff Greenberg returned.  David Hyde Pierce had been approached, but it was later reported that he had declined and the other actors from the original series were either not returning or unlikely to return. Jane Leeves and Peri Gilpin had previously discussed the possibility of a revival.

In January 2023, Jack Cutmore-Scott joined the cast as Freddy Crane. It was also reported that English actor Nicholas Lyndhurst would be joining the cast. Later that month, Anders Keith and Jess Salgueiro were cast as Niles and Daphne's son and Freddy's roommate, respectively. In February, Toks Olagundoye was cast as Olivia.

In March 2023, it was announced that Bebe Neuwirth would be reprising her role as Lilith Sternin in the revival.

Filming 
On January 30, 2023, casting director Jeff Greenberg shared a picture of a script page from a table read which gave some more information about the show. The first episode, the pilot, will be called "The Good Father" (a reference to the pilot of the original series being called "The Good Son"). It will be written by Joe Cristalli & Chris Harris and directed by veteran sitcom director James Burrows. Filming of the pilot episode took place in the first week of February, 2023. Burrows will direct the first two episodes.

References

External links 
  (2023 series)

Frasier
2020s American sitcoms
American television spin-offs
Cheers
English-language television shows
Paramount+ original programming
Television shows set in Boston
Television shows filmed in Los Angeles
Upcoming comedy television series